Bomani Babatunde Jones (born August 26, 1980) is an American sports journalist who is currently employed by ESPN. He was the co-host of Highly Questionable with Dan Le Batard, before leaving the show in June 2017 to develop his own show, High Noon. He is also a regular panelist on Around the Horn. Jones also hosts the podcast The Right Time with Bomani Jones for ESPN and his own podcast The Evening Jones.  He has also written for SB Nation, Salon and Page 2 at ESPN.com.  His sister is award-winning novelist Tayari Jones.

Early life and education
Jones was born in Atlanta, Georgia. Later he moved to Houston, Texas, attending school in the town of Waller in the Greater Houston area. His economist mother Barbara Ann Posey and political scientist father Mack are professors and activists. Jones graduated from Clark Atlanta University in 2001 with a bachelor's degree in economics. He followed that up with a master’s in politics, economics and business from Claremont Graduate University and a master’s in economics from the University of North Carolina at Chapel Hill. He later studied towards a doctorate in economics at UNC, while living in Durham, North Carolina.

Career
Prior to his career as a sports writer, beginning in 2004 Jones worked as a music and pop culture critic, including writing for AOL and ESPN.com. From January 2008 to October 2009, Jones hosted two radio shows in Raleigh: The Three Hour Lunch Break on 620 the Bull, and Sports Saturday with Bomani Jones on 850 the Buzz. The shows ended after the radio stations were sold. In January 2010, Jones launched his radio show, The Morning Jones, which was hosted from Durham, North Carolina. Also in 2010, Jones began appearing as a contributor on ESPN's Outside the Lines, and as a panelist on Around the Horn. The Morning Jones ended on August 30, 2011. Jones later hosted his own internet shows, The Evening Jones, and Bomani & Jones on SB Nation's YouTube channel until January 2013.

Beginning in 2012, Jones appeared regularly on Dan Le Batard's ESPN2 show, Dan Le Batard Is Highly Questionable, where he discussed major sports stories with Le Batard. Around the same time, he began guest hosting on The Dan Le Batard Show with Stugotz radio show on The Ticket Miami on Wednesdays. On May 9, 2013 it was reported that Jones had signed a new four-year contract with ESPN. In May 2013, Jones became co-host of the renamed Highly Questionable, which would move to ESPN in March 2015. Jones remained on Highly Questionable until June 2017, when he left the show to prepare for a new project with fellow ESPN talent Pablo S. Torre.

In January 2014, Jones won three consecutive Around the Horn episodes in which he appeared. As of October 30, 2014, Jones has 104 wins in 373 appearances on ESPN's Around the Horn. On March 30, 2015, The Right Time With Bomani Jones debuted on ESPN Radio. On September 21, 2015, The Right Time was moved to the 4 to 7 PM time slot. In December 2017, "The Right Time" ceased airing daily on ESPN radio and would reappear as an ESPN Podcast in April 2018. On June 4, 2018, Jones co-led the series debut of High Noon with Pablo Torre on ESPN. On March 13, 2022, Jones began a new show, Game Theory with Bomani Jones on HBO. Jones has served as an adjunct professor at Duke University and Elon University.

References

External links

The Morning Jones on Sirius
 The Evening Jones

1980 births
Living people
American sports radio personalities
Claremont Graduate University alumni
Clark Atlanta University alumni
ESPN people
People from Houston
People from Durham, North Carolina
University of North Carolina at Chapel Hill alumni